Alexandra Leclère is a French film director. She is also a screenwriter and dialogue writer. Her short film, Bouche à bouche, won two jury prizes, at the Cinéma au Parfum de Grasse Festival in 2003 and at the International Festival of Short Films in Belo Horizante, Brazil.

Filmography (director and screenwriter) 
 2002 : Bouche à bouche (short)
 2004 : Les Sœurs fâchées
 2007 : Le Prix à payer (English title: The Price to Pay)
 2012 : Maman
 2015 : Le grand partage (English title: The Roommates Party)
 2017 : Garde alternée

References

External links 

French film directors
French women screenwriters
French screenwriters
Living people
French women film directors
Year of birth missing (living people)